Chaat, or chāt (IAST:  cāṭ) is a family of savoury snacks that originated in India, typically served as an hors d'oeuvre or at roadside tracks from stalls or food carts across South Asia in India, Pakistan, Nepal and Bangladesh. With its origins in Uttar Pradesh, India, chaat has become immensely popular in the rest of South Asia.

Etymology

The word derives from Hindi cāṭ चाट (tasting, a delicacy), from cāṭnā चाटना (to lick, as in licking one's fingers while eating), from Prakrit caṭṭei चट्टेइ (to devour with relish, eat noisily).

Overview

The chaat variants are all based on fried dough, with various other ingredients. The original chaat is a mixture of potato pieces, crisp fried bread dahi vada or dahi bhalla, gram or chickpeas and tangy-salty spices, with sour Indian chili and saunth (dried ginger and tamarind sauce), fresh green coriander leaves and yogurt for garnish, but other popular variants included alu tikkis or samosa (garnished with onion, potatoes, coriander, peas, hot spices and a dash of yogurt), bhel puri, dahi puri, panipuri, dahi vada, papri chaat, and sev puri.

There are common elements among these variants including dahi (yogurt); chopped onions and coriander; sev (thin dried yellow salty noodles); and chaat masala, typically consisting of amchoor (dried mango powder), cumin, kala namak (Himalayan black rock salt), coriander, dried ginger, salt, black pepper, and red pepper. The ingredients are combined and served on a small metal plate or a banana leaf, dried and formed into a bowl.

History
Some of the dishes now categorized as chaats, such as Dahi Vada, can be traced back to ancient periods. A recipe for a dahi vada analogue called kshiravata is mentioned in Manasollasa, a 12th-century Sanskrit encyclopedia compiled by Someshvara III, who ruled from present-day Karnataka. According to food historian K.T Achaya, descriptions of dahi vada also appear in literature far earlier from 500 BC.

Chaat as an organized phenomenon or distinct group of dishes, according to culinary anthropologist Kurush Dalal, originated in northern India (now Uttar Pradesh) in the late 17th century during the reign of Mughal Emperor Shah Jahan. The royal doctors had asked the people of Delhi to consume spicy and fried snacks, as well as dahi, as a countermeasure to the alkaline water of the Yamuna river that coursed through the city. Thus, chaat was invented.

Most chaats originated in some parts of Uttar Pradesh in India, but they are now eaten all across South Asia and neighboring countries. Some are results of cultural syncretism.

Regions
Chaat is famous in South Asia in India, Pakistan, Nepal and Bangladesh.

Variations

 Alu chaat - Potatoes (alu in Hindi) cut into small pieces, fried till crisp and served with chutney
 Alu tikki
 Bedmi - Puri stuffed with dal and fried till crisp. Typically served with alu sabji and eaten for breakfast
 Bhalla/alu tikki
 Bhelpuri
 Ragda patties (alu tikki chaat)
 Cheela- Besan (chickpea flour) pancakes served with chutney and sooth (sweet chutney)
 Chotpoti, mixture of boiled diced potatoes, boiled chickpeas and sliced onions and chillies with grated eggs on top. Many kinds of roasted spice powder are used in its preparation.
 Dahi puri
 Dahi vada
 Kachori- or Kachauri, with variants such as Khasta Kachuari
 Mangode - Similar to pakora, but besan paste is replaced with yellow moong paste
 Pakora - Different things such as paneer, vegetable dipped in besan (chickpea/gram flour) paste and fried.
 Panipuri
 Masalapuri
 Chana chaat
 Papri chaat - This contains fried patty called papri as an extra ingredient.
 Samosa chaat - samosa is broken into pieces with green and sweet chutney added to it.
 Sevpuri
 Vada pav
 Dahi bhallay ki chaat (bhallay, potatoes, chickpeas, imli chutney, chaat masala, onions, tomatoes, dahi etc.)
 Beetroot & potato chaat
 Dhaka chaat
 Paneer chaat puri
 Thattu Vadai Set
Dal ki chaat - Made with moong dal mixed with spices and chutney and accompanied with wheat biscuits. Popular in Meerut.
Raj kachori - a big hollow ball made with wheat and filled with sprouts, chickpeas, potatoes, bhalla and chutneys (sweet and green).
Basket chaat - Edible bowl made with potato and filled with sprouts, chickpeas, potato and chutneys. Popular in Lucknow.
Daulat ki chaat - A sweet preparation made from keeping condensed milk in winter mist. 
Ram ladoo - Round fitters made from mong dal and served with radish and grey chutney.
 Dabeli - a sweet and sour burger like Gujrati snack made with potatoes, sev, groundnut and pomegranate
Barule - whole potato coated with besan is deepfried and served with green chutney.

See also
 List of Indian snack foods
 List of tapas (Spanish snacks)

References

External links
 

Bangladeshi snack foods
Bangladeshi fast food
Pakistani snack foods
Pakistani fast food
Indian snack foods
Bihari cuisine
Nepalese cuisine
Uttar Pradeshi cuisine
Indian fast food
Appetizers
Gujarati cuisine
Street food
Pakistani cuisine
Bangladeshi cuisine
Indo-Caribbean cuisine